Ustad Abed Hossain Khan (1 April 1929 – 29 April 1996) was a Bangladeshi musician, music composer and music director. He was awarded Ekushey Padak in 1985 by the government of Bangladesh.

Career
Khan took sitar lessons from his father, Ustad Ayet Ali Khan. In 1950, after completing BA, he joined the Dhaka Station of Radio Pakistan as a staff artist.

Khan was  a music teacher in Bangladesh Shilpakala Academy. He performed the sitar and the sarod on Bangladesh Radio and Bangladesh Television regularly.

Khan performed with German musicians Phillip Karl Schaeffer and Michael Grube.

References

1929 births
1996 deaths
Bangladeshi male musicians
20th-century male musicians
Recipients of the Ekushey Padak